The 2022 6 Hours of Abu Dhabi powered by Hankook was a non-championship endurance race, as part of the 24H Series. It was the second running of the race and was held at the Yas Marina Circuit on 21–22 January 2022. The race was contested with GT3-spec cars, GT4-spec cars, sports cars, 24H-Specials, like silhouette cars, TCR Touring Cars, TCX cars and TC cars.

Teams and drivers